The men's Greco-Roman middleweight was one of thirteen wrestling events held as part of the wrestling at the 1928 Summer Olympics programme. The competition was held from August 2 to 5, and featured 17 wrestlers from 17 nations.

Competition format

This Greco-Roman wrestling competition introduced an elimination system based on the accumulation of points. Each round featured all wrestlers pairing off and wrestling one bout (with one wrestler having a bye if there were an odd number). The loser received 3 points. The winner received 1 point if the win was by decision and 0 points if the win was by fall. At the end of each round, any wrestler with at least 5 points was eliminated.

Results

Round 1

The first round produced 4 winners by fall (0 points), 1 bye (0 points), 4 winners by decision (1 point), and 8 losers (3 points).

 Bouts

 Points

Round 2

Jacobsen (second win by fall) and Kokkinen (bye, win by fall) stayed at 0 points. Four men finished the second round at 2–0 with one win by fall and one by decision for 1 point apiece. Five more were 1–1 with either 3 or 4 points depending on how the win was achieved. Walzer had 3 points after a loss and a bye. Five wrestlers were 0–2 and were eliminated.

 Bouts

 Points

Round 3

All 6 bouts in round 3 were won by fall, so the winners remained at the same point totals: Jacobsen and Kokkinen at 0, Kusnets and Papp at 1, Hala at 3, and Baytorun at 4. Two of the losers—Bonassin and Saenen—reached only 4 points and continued in competition. The other 4 losers were eliminated.

 Bouts

 Points

Round 4

Jacobsen had his first loss, but only went to 3 points and continued in competition. The other three losers were eliminated. Kokkinen was the only man left with 0 points. Each of the 5 remaining wrestlers had a different point total, 0 through 4.

 Bouts

 Points

Round 5

With Jacobsen on a bye, and Kokkinen (at 0 points) and Papp (at 1 point) facing each other in a no-elimination-possible match, the only man that would be eliminated in round 5 was the loser of the Kusnets vs. Saenen bout. Kusnets won, so Saenen was eliminated.

 Bouts

 Points

Round 6

In contrast to the previous round which eliminated only 1 of 5 wrestlers, round 6 eliminated 3 of the remaining 4. Kokkinen beat Jacobsen to eliminate the latter man, who finished in 4th place. The Papp vs. Kusnets match ended in mutual elimination because Papp won by decision; both men finished with 5 points, but Papp had the head-to-head tie-breaker because of this win and received the silver medal. Kokkinen, who never received a point in the tournament (a bye and 4 wins by fall), won the gold medal as the last man remaining.

 Bouts

 Points

References

Wrestling at the 1928 Summer Olympics